Aaron McCarthy (born 26 February ?) is a TV presenter on the Channel 10 travel program What's Up Downunder. He also has hosting roles on Live on Bowen, Melbourne 22 & Victoria's Islands on C31. Aaron appeared on the front cover of Fjorde Magazine Issue XV.

References

External links
 

Australian television presenters
Living people
RMITV alumni
Year of birth missing (living people)